Nicholas or Nick West may refer to:

Fictional characters
Nick West, character in Doctors (2000 TV series)
Nick West, character in 35 and Ticking

Others
Nicholas West (1461–1533), English bishop and diplomatist
Nick West (soccer) (born 1997), American association football midfielder
Kin Platt (1911–2003), American writer and artist who used Nick West as one of his pseudonyms
Nick West (author) of The American series of The Three Investigators
Nick West (rally driver), see List of World Rally Championship drivers